"Maybe Tomorrow" is the third episode of the second season of the American anthology crime drama television series True Detective. It is the 11th overall episode of the series and was written by series creator Nic Pizzolatto, and directed by Janus Metz. It was first broadcast on HBO in the United States on July 5, 2015.

The season is set in California, and focuses on three detectives, Ray Velcoro (Colin Farrell), Ani Bezzerides (Rachel McAdams) and Paul Woodrugh (Taylor Kitsch), from three cooperating police departments and a criminal-turned-businessman named Frank Semyon (Vince Vaughn) as they investigate a series of crimes they believe are linked to the murder of a corrupt politician. In the episode, Velcoro survives an attack and returns with Bezzerides and Woodrugh to investigate Caspere's death, while Semyon has his authority tested by former allies.

According to Nielsen Media Research, the episode was seen by an estimated 2.62 million household viewers and gained a 1.1 ratings share among adults aged 18–49. The episode received generally positive reviews from critics, who praised the performances and character development, although some expressed frustration with the anticlimactic resolution to the previous episode.

Plot
In a dream sequence, Velcoro (Colin Farrell) talks with his father Eddie (Fred Ward) at a bar, while a man sings "The Rose" in the background. Eddie reprimands his son for failing to show his "grit". In real life, Velcoro wakes up in Caspere's house, with no major wounds from the bullets, as the shotgun was loaded with rubber pelleted riot control rounds. As he is tended by medics, Bezzerides (Rachel McAdams) arrives and reprimands him. In the house, a hard drive is reported to have been stolen.

Semyon (Vince Vaughn) begins suffering erectile dysfunction, apparently from all the pressure from his workplace. He later meets with Velcoro, who demands to know if anyone knew about what would happen at Caspere's house but Semyon claims no knowledge. Bezzerides and Woodrugh (Taylor Kitsch) attempt to find a connection between Caspere and Mayor Chessani (Ritchie Coster), so they visit his mansion. They meet his trophy wife, Betty (Emily Rios), who spends her days intoxicated. They also meet her moody daughter and his problematic son, none of which provide them with any help. Chessani is angry about the encounter and threatens to remove them from the case.

Velcoro visits Eddie to give him marijuana to help him sleep. During their talk, Eddie talks about his encounters with Holloway (Afemo Omilami) and Burris (James Frain). Semyon is informed by Osip (Timothy V. Murphy) that he is leaving for Las Vegas amid his crisis, angering him. After he leaves, he wonders if Osip had a role in Caspere's death. He is later informed that Stan, one of his associates, has been found dead. Meanwhile, Woodrugh reconnects with an old friend from the private security firm Black Mountain, Miguel Gilb (Gabriel Luna), and they go out. However, Miguel brings up a sexual relationship they had during the war, prompting Woodrugh to punch him and leave him. Unbeknownst to him, Dixon (W. Earl Brown) takes pictures of the encounter.

Tracing the Cadillac that possibly drove Caspere to the rest stop, Velcoro and Bezzerides visit a movie set, where a similar car was reported missing one week before Caspere's death. That night, Bezzerides and Velcoro drink at his house when Gena (Abigail Spencer) shows up. She says she was questioned by the police about his actions and possible corruption. She offers to give him $10,000 to drop the custody battle, which he refuses. Woodrugh visits a strip club, looking for Caspere's contact and inadvertently runs into Semyon. While Paul looks for the contact, Semyon confronts Danny Santos (Pedro Miguel Arce) for failing to support him and brutally attacks him before removing his golden teeth.

Based on a tip, Bezzerides and Velcoro question a former movie production employee from the set, a person lights on fire the Cadillac that drove Caspere to the rest stop. They chase the masked man, who manages to evade them. As Bezzerides is near him, a truck nearly hits her until Velcoro takes her out of the highway. Afterwards, he asks her about the evidence of corruption the state might have against him, but Bezzerides claims not to know anything. In the final scene, Semyon returns home to find Jordan (Kelly Reilly) awake, who wants to reconcile after a previous fight they had. Semyon drops Santos' teeth in the garbage. She asks if they can talk, to which he says "maybe tomorrow".

Production

Development
In June 2015, the episode's title was revealed as "Maybe Tomorrow" and it was announced that series creator Nic Pizzolatto had written the episode while Janus Metz had directed it. This was Pizzolatto's eleventh writing credit, and Metz's first directing credit.

Reception

Viewers
The episode was watched by 2.62 million viewers, earning a 1.1 in the 18-49 rating demographics on the Nielson ratings scale. This means that 1.1 percent of all households with televisions watched the episode. This was a 15% decrease from the previous episode, which was watched by 3.05 million viewers with a 1.3 in the 18-49 demographics.

Critical reviews
"Maybe Tomorrow" received generally positive reviews from critics. The review aggregator website Rotten Tomatoes reported a 71% approval rating for the episode, based on 28 reviews, with an average rating of 7.5/10. The site's consensus states: "'Maybe Tomorrow' serves as a dark, stylish diversion from earlier episodes, even if it offers a somewhat less-than-satisfying conclusion to a previous cliffhanger."

Roth Cornet of IGN gave the episode a "great" 8 out of 10 and wrote in her verdict, "The third installment of True Detectives second season has the potential to become a pivotal turing point for fans. This is the moment where we really decide if we're in or if we're out. While on the whole this season has been uneven, based on the continued development of Velcoro's character - who reads as the most nuanced - and the turns that the murder investigation has taken (what's with that animal mask?) I'm in for now. How about you?"

Erik Adams of The A.V. Club gave the episode a "B+" grade and wrote, "If season two is going to put so much emphasis on its investigations, eventually those façades will have to give way to hard evidence. For now, though, there's enough bang in 'Maybe Tomorrow' to make me wish I could jump into the next installment." Britt Hayes of Screen Crush wrote, "That said, now that we've arrived at episode 3, there's less exposition and more character work at play. I still find this season to be a little too verbose, and if it has any one, specific issue it's the volume of characters and stories. But Pizzolatto is clearly working all these threads to tie them together into something cohesive and possibly great near the end of the season, and watching him do so — whether it's graceful or a bit clumsy — has its rewards."

Alan Sepinwall of HitFix wrote, "This was a stranger episode than the first two, and a slightly better one. Is that a coincidence, or is it that Pizzolatto, like Paul Woodrugh, needs to accept a part of him (or, at least, part of his writing style) that he tries to dismiss?" Gwilym Mumford of The Guardian wrote, "There are revelations from Paul's military past and some unexpected dental work, and e-cigarettes come in for more stick." Ben Travers of IndieWire gave the episode a "B+" grade and wrote, "Pizzolatto got his groove back in Episode 3. Even with an imperfect episode, 'Maybe Tomorrow' gave us the good reason to believe the best is yet to come."

Jeff Jensen of Entertainment Weekly wrote, "More masks, more hard-boiled angst, and more apocalypse for everyone." Aaron Riccio of Slant Magazine wrote, "When everything is shit in the present, the best we can do, perhaps, is to wait it out and hope for the best."

Kenny Herzog of Vulture gave the episode a 4 star rating out of 5 and wrote, "These four lost souls are living in Wyler/Kingsley's Detective Story in full color, where crazy killers in masks come out from darkness, stalk you, and light that stolen Cadillac you've been searching for ablaze, only to race back into the night. Where everyone seems to be in on something but you. It's a movie, but it's real life, and it's all a bit distorted." Tony Sokol of Den of Geek gave the episode a 4 star rating out of 5 and wrote, "In an eight episode arc, when compared to the five seasons of Game of Thrones, this is about the point in the story that the gang on Thrones lost daddy Stark. Well they didn't lose him so much as they misplaced his head. Nic Pizzolatto is playing with that very dynamic. He's a novelist, you know."

Carissa Pavlica of TV Fanatic gave the episode a 3.5 star rating out of 5 and wrote, "Forgive me if I'm thick, but I cannot for the life of me figure out in what direction the case is going. Some of the dialog is disturbingly comical and throws off the scent of the big picture. However, it felt like we were given a better understanding of why Ray and Ani were chosen to be leads on the case, whatever it may be." Shane Ryan of Paste gave the episode a 8.5 out of 10 and wrote, "Aligned against the killer, aligned against their bosses, aligned against the encroaching corruption on ever side. It's an intriguing possibility, and for the first time since the new season began, I can honestly say that I'm dying to see what comes next."

References

External links
 "Maybe Tomorrow" at HBO
 

2015 American television episodes
True Detective episodes
Television episodes written by Nic Pizzolatto